The 2008 Syracuse Orange football team represented Syracuse University during the 2008 NCAA Division I FBS football season. The Orange were coached by Greg Robinson and played their home games at the Carrier Dome in Syracuse, New York.

Before the season
The Orange lost its leading receiving from the 2007 season, Mike Williams.  Williams was suspended from the team due to academic reasons.  The most recent report says that Williams is not enrolled in classes for the fall semester.FB | Leading receiver Williams suspended from school - Sports Williams led the team with 60 catches for 837 yards in 2007.  He finished the season on a school-record streak of nine games with a touchdown reception.  That mark stands nine short of Larry Fitzgerald's record of 18 consecutive games.

Syracuse's number two receiver, Taj Smith, declared himself eligible for the NFL Draft.  Smith was not drafted, but did sign as a free agent with the Green Bay Packers.  Smith recorded 44 catches for 822 yards in 2007.

Recruiting
Syracuse landed the nation's No. 50 recruiting class, which featured three 4-star recruits and five 3-star recruits. The class was headlined by Churchville, NY tailback Averin Collier, Syracuse, NY receiver Marcus Sales and New Berlin defensive end Romale Tucker.

Schedule

Game summaries

Northwestern

Syracuse opened the 2008 football season with a 30–10 defeat at the hands of Northwestern.  The Orange marched the ball 63 yards on its opening drive, settling for a 36-yard field goal. SU's defense kept Northwestern at bay until late in the second quarter, but the offense provided the Wildcats first points. Syracuse quarterback Andrew Robinson was called for intentional grounding in his own end zone, resulting in a safety. Northwestern closed out the first half with 16-yard touchdown pass.

The Orange took advantage of a Tyrell Sutton fumble to open the second half.  The ensuing touchdown run from back Curtis Brinkley gave the Orange its second lead of the game 10–9.  Brinkley would finish with 49 yards on nine carries.  He was joined by Delone Carter and Doug Hogue in the backfield.  Neither broke 50 yards, though Carter's long rush of 32 yards was longer than any carry the Orange had in the 2007 season.

Northwestern closed the game on a 21-point run.  One of those touchdowns came off an interception.  From the opening drive on, the Orange had only one possession that went longer than 40 yards.  The drive resulted in a missed field goal, as kicker Patrick Shadle hit the upright from 51 yards out.

The season opening loss was the Orange's fifth straight.

Akron

Syracuse lost its fourth straight home opener and second straight game to a MAC opponent with a 42–28 loss to Akron.  The Zips set the pace early, taking the ball 65 yards down the field for a touchdown.  Akron scored again in the first quarter.  The 79-yard drive was capped off with a 35-yard run by Dennis Kennedy.

The Orange found the endzone for the first time in the second quarter.  Quarterback Cam Dantley connected with tight end Mike Owen for a 32-yard touchdown pass, his first career touchdown reception.  Akron and Syracuse would then exchange touchdowns on one-yard runs.  The Orange's score came from Curtis Brinkley, who set a career-high with 143 yards.  The Zips would score again on a one-yard carry heading into halftime.

Syracuse tied the game in the fourth quarter, thanks to two touchdown passes from Dantley.  One went for four-yards to Owen; the other was a 15-yard pass to redshirt freshman Nick Provo.  Dantley finished 13-of-20 with 135 yards, 3 touchdowns and an interception.  Akron put the game out of reach with back-to-back touchdowns.

Penn State

Syracuse renewed its historic rivalry with Penn State with a 55–13 defeat. The teams last played in 1990.

Each of Penn State's three quarterbacks threw touchdown passes. Daryll Clark finished 10 of 21 for 163 yards and two touchdowns, Pat Devlin was 8 of 13 for 130 yards and two touchdowns, and Paul Cianciolo was 2 of 4 for 51 yards and a score. Receivers Jordan Norwood and Deon Butler both had over 100 yards receiving and two touchdowns apiece.

The Nittany Lion defense held the Orange offense without a first down until early in the second quarter.

Northeastern

Syracuse defeated Football Championship Subdivision Northeastern, 30–21, behind a combined 245 yards and two touchdowns from tailbacks Doug Hogue and Curtis Brinkley.

Quarterback Cam Dantley completing 14 of 17 passes for 167 yards and one touchdown in his third straight start for the Orange.

Pittsburgh

Pittsburgh tailback LaRod Stephens-Howling scored two touchdowns in the fourth quarter, Conor Lee kicked four field goals, and Pittsburgh scored 18 unanswered points in the fourth quarter to rally past Syracuse 34–24.

West Virginia

Playing without starting quarterback Pat White, West Virginia turned to tailback Noel Devine, who rushed for a career-high 188 yards and a touchdown, in a West Virginia 17–6 win.

Although Syracuse outgained West Virginia 346–268, and SU tailback Curtis Brinkley rushed for 144 yards, the Orange (1–5, 0–2) didn't register a touchdown for the first time in the season.

South Florida

South Florida quarterback Matt Grothe threw three touchdown passes and ran for another as South Florida crushed Syracuse, 45–13. Grothe finished with 72 yards on the ground and went finished 19-for-26 in the air for 248 yards.

Louisville

Syracuse tailback Curtis Brinkley set a Syracuse single-season record Saturday night with his fifth consecutive 100-yard game as Syracuse upset Louisville for the second year in a row, 28–21.

The win was just head coach Greg Robinson's third Big East Conference win. After the game, Robinson had accumulated a 3–22 overall in four seasons against the Big East.

Rutgers

Rutgers quarterback Mike Teel threw three touchdown passes and Rutgers overcame a 14-point deficit to beat Syracuse 35–17. The loss made the Orange ineligible to compete in a bowl game for the fourth straight year under coach Robinson.

Connecticut

Connecticut tailback Donald Brown rushed for 131 yards and a touchdown, Jasper Howard scored on a 69-yard punt return and Robert McClain delivered a 37-yard interception return for a score as Connecticut defeated Syracuse 39–14. Connecticut broke the game open after struggling to hold on to a 22–14 second half lead.

Notre Dame

A week after Syracuse announced that it was firing its head coach at the conclusion of the season, Syracuse delivered the biggest win under the Robinson era, stunning the Irish in South Bend, 24–23. QB Cameron Dantley's 11-yard touchdown pass to Donte Davis with 42 seconds left proved to be the game winner, as the Irish lost to an eight-loss team for the first time in its school's storied history.

The victory allowed Syracuse (3–8) to avoid a third 10-loss season in four years under Robinson.

Cincinnati

The Greg Robinson era came to an end against the Bearcats as the Orange was dominated by the Bearcats. Cincinnati QB Tony Pike threw for 274 yards on 28-of-44 passes while kicker Jake Rogers connected from 45, 38 and 45 yards.  Syracuse went 10–47 in coach Greg Robinson’s four seasons, including 3–25 in the Big East.

Rankings

Coaching staff

 Greg Robinson – Head Coach/Co-Defensive Coordinator
 Mitch Browning – Offensive Coordinator/Tight Ends & Offensive Tackles
 Derrick Jackson – Co-Defensive Coordinator/Defensive Line
 Phil Earley – Quarterbacks
 Dan Conley – Linebackers
 Jim Salgado – Cornerbacks/Secondary
 Scott Spencer – Safeties
 Randy Trivers – Running Backs
 Chris White – Wide Receivers
 Chris Wiesehan – Offensive Line

Statistics

Team

Scores by quarter

Offense
Note: These lists are not complete.  Only the leaders are included.

Rushing

Passing

Receiving
Note: This is not a complete list.

Defensive Leaders
Note: This list includes only defensive leaders.  Click 2009 Football Statistics (0-2) for a complete list.

Special teams

References

Syracuse
Syracuse Orange football seasons
Syracuse Orange football